Vincenzo Ortoleva (23 May 1965, Catania, Italy) is an Italian classical philologist.

Ortoleva studied from 1983 to 1988 Classical Philology at University of Catania. In 1996 he took his PhD with the dissertation "La tradizione manoscritta della Mulomedicina di Publio Vegezio Renato". After his teach licence in 2003, he became in 2005 Full Professor of Classical Philology at University of Catania. His particular fields of research are Greek and Latin literature, text tradition, textual criticism and history of classical scholarship. He has also discovered several manuscripts of Greek and Latin authors: for instance an anonymous Greek translation of the Disticha Catonis in the Cod. Monacensis Gr. 551 and unpublished fragments of the Latin writer Pelagonius in Cod. Verona, Biblioteca civica, 658.

Main publications 

  A proposito di alcuni autografi scaligerani: Giuseppe Scaligero editore e traduttore dei Disticha Catonis. in Siculorum Gymnasium, N.S. 43, 1990, pp. 277–285.
  Una traduzione greca inedita dei Disticha Catonis, in Sileno. Rivista di sudi classici e cristiani, 16, 1990,  pp. 287–300.
 Maximus Planudes, Disticha Catonis in Graecum translata. Edidit Vincentius Ortoleva. Edizioni dell'Ateneo, Roma 1992. .
 Glosse in καθαρεύουσα alla traduzione planudea dei Disticha Catonis. in "Eikasmós", 1992, 3, pp. 265–276.
 La cosiddetta tradizione "epitomata" della Mulomedicina di Vegezio: recensio deterior o tradizione indiretta?. in Revue d'Histoire des Textes 24, 1994, pp. 251–274.
 Note critiche al De genio Socratis di Plutarco (I), in Sileno. Rivista di studi classici e cristiani 20, 1994, pp. 375–393.
 Note critiche al De genio Socratis di Plutarco (II), in Sileno. Rivista di studi classici e cristiani 21, 1994,  pp. 201–220.
 La parafrasi della traduzione planudea dei Disticha Catonis nel cod. Barocc. 71, in Byzantion,  55, 1995, pp. 89–97.
 La tradizione manoscritta della «Mulomedicina» di Publio Vegezio Renato. Editrice Sileno, Acireale 1996.
 Un nuovo testimone frammentario di Pelagonio e alcune considerazioni sulla tradizione manoscritta e sul testo dell'Ars ueterinaria, in Res Publica Litterarum  21, 1998, pp. 13–44.
 Publii Vegeti Renati Digesta artis mulomedicinalis, liber primus, introduzione, testo critico e commento a cura di Vincenzo Ortoleva, Catania, Dipartimento di Studi antichi e tardoantichi, 1999.
 Note critico-testuali ed esegetiche al primo libro dei Digesta artis mulomedicinalis di Vegezio. in Wiener Studien, 113, 2000, pp. 245–280.
 La terminologia greco-latina per designare le andature del cavallo (con un'appendice sull'etimologia dell'italiano danzare), in Indogermanische Forschungen, 106, 2001, pp. 126–163.
 I termini 'strem(m)a' e 'semis' nella Mulomedicina Chironis e in Vegezio, in Latomus, 61, 2002, pp. 415–437.
 Tre note al testo dell’Epitoma rei militaris di Vegezio (ovvero i limiti della filologia classica), in Philologus, 148, 2004, pp. 143–167.
 Ancora sul latino saliuatum, saliuare, in Hermes], 134, 2006, pp. 352–366.
 A proposito di una recente edizione dell’Epitoma rei militaris di Vegezio, in Emerita, 74, 2006, pp. 47–75. (Online).
 "Veg. Mil. 1,5,3–4", in  Museum Helveticum, 64, 2007, pp. 122–124. (Online).
 Catullo 107.7-8, in Sileno. Rivista di studi classici e cristiani, 33, 2007, pp. 139–149. (Online; PDF; 631 kB).
 L’opera del veterinario in Edict. Diocl. 7, 20–21., in Rheinisches Museum für Philologie, 151, 2008, pp. 357–364. (Online; PDF; 64 kB).
 , in  La veterinaria antica e medievale (testi greci, latini, arabi e romanzi). Atti del II Convegno internazionale, Catania 3.–5. Oktober 2007, ed. by V. Ortoleva and M. R. Petringa, Lugano 2009, pp. 153–181. (Online; PDF; 962 kB).
 Lat. tripedica., in Indogermanische Forschungen, 114, 2009, 240–256..
 Max Ihm e Eugen Oder. A proposito di alcuni autografi recentemente scoperti, in Philologia antiqua, 5, 2012, pp. 49–84.
 Palladio 3,30: un autentico caso di nominatiuus pendens?, in: Latin vulgaire - Latin tardif, IXe Colloque international 2-6 septembre 2009, Université Lumière Lyon 2, Lyon 2012, pp. 235–252.
 Lat. Taurura e Gregorio di Nazianzo De uita sua 126, in Rivista di Filologia e di Istruzione classica, 141/1, 2013, pp. 123–136.
 The meaning and etymology of the adjective apiosus, in B. Maire (ed.), ‘Greek’ and ‘Roman’ in Latin Medical Texts, Studies in Cultural Change and Exchange in Ancient Medicine, Leiden 2014,pp. 257–288.
 La congiunzione nē nel latino tardo (a proposito di Veg. mil. 4,41,4), in Latin Vulgaire Latin Tardif X - Actes du Xe colloque international sur le latin vulgaire et tardif, Bergamo, 5-9 septembre 2012, Bergamo 2014, pp. 323–342.
 Un frammento inedito di un non identificato trattato di medicina tardolatino, in Revue d'Histoire des Textes , n. s. 10, 2015, pp. 197–214.
 Le Pelagonianae emendationes: un inedito di Christian Theophil Schuch. Contributo alla critica del testo dell’Ars ueterinaria, in Eikasmós , 26, 2015, pp. 343–368.

External links 
 Website of Vincenzo Ortoleva
 Publications of Vincenzo Ortoleva
 Vincenzo Ortoleva in the Website of the University of Catania

References

Italian classical scholars
1965 births
Living people